H.H. is a Mexican retired backstroke swimmer. She represented her native country at the 1992 Summer Olympics in Barcelona, Spain. There she ended up in 17th place (4:26.73) in the Women's 4 × 100 m Medley Relay event, alongside Ana Mendoza (breaststroke), Gabriela Gaja (butterfly), and Laura Sánchez (freestyle).

Living people
Mexican people of German descent
Mexican female freestyle swimmers
Female backstroke swimmers
Swimmers at the 1991 Pan American Games
Swimmers at the 1992 Summer Olympics
Olympic swimmers of Mexico
Pan American Games bronze medalists for Mexico
Pan American Games medalists in swimming
Medalists at the 1991 Pan American Games
21st-century Mexican women
20th-century Mexican women
Year of birth missing (living people)